Deadly Chase may refer to:

 The Submarine Caper, a Hardy Boys book, later retitled Deadly Chase
 Deadly Chase (film), a 1978 Italian film